Fairfax High School (officially Fairfax Senior High School) is a Los Angeles Unified School District high school located in Los Angeles, California, near the border of West Hollywood in the Fairfax District. The school is located on a  campus at the intersection of Fairfax Avenue and trendy Melrose Avenue.

Several sections of Los Angeles, including the Fairfax District, Park La Brea, portions of Hancock Park, and Larchmont, and the city of West Hollywood are served by Fairfax. Some areas (including parts of West Hollywood) are jointly zoned to Fairfax High School and Hollywood High School. In fall 2007, some neighborhoods zoned to Hamilton High School were rezoned to Fairfax High School. Bancroft Middle School, Emerson Middle School, Le Conte Middle School, and John Burroughs Middle School feed into Fairfax. In 2009, some territory from the Los Angeles High School attendance boundary was transferred to Fairfax High School.
Fairfax High School has been widely regarded as one of the most diverse high schools in the city, state, and country.

History

Fairfax High School was founded in 1924 under the direction of Principal Rae G. Van Cleve, for whom the athletic field is named. The original Spanish Colonial Revival main building did not meet earthquake safety standards, and most of the original campus facilities were demolished in 1966. However, the historic D. S. Swan Auditorium and iconic Rotunda were spared by preservationists and retrofitted. The theater was renovated in 2014. Greenway Court, originally built in 1939 as a social hall by the students at Fairfax as a class project, was also spared and was moved to its current location on Fairfax Avenue, where it was converted into a theater in 1999 by the Greenway Arts Alliance and renamed the Greenway Court Theater.

In previous eras, the school had a reputation for academic excellence and it had a majority Jewish student body.

Former NFL official Jim Tunney served as the school's principal from 1964 to 1970. Under his watch, most of the current campus facilities, except for those mentioned above, were built between 1966 and 1968, including the gymnasium.

When the 1971 San Fernando earthquake struck with a moment magnitude of 6.5–6.7, nearby Los Angeles High School was damaged severely and closed for repairs. Students from Los Angeles High attended Fairfax High on "double sessions", with Fairfax students using the campus from 7 am to 12 noon, and LA High students from 12:30 pm to 5 pm.

Fairfax was the foreign language magnet school in the 1960s and 1970s, offering Hebrew, German, Chinese and Latin, among other languages. The Fairfax Magnet Center for Visual Arts opened in 1981 and remains the only visual arts magnet in the Los Angeles Unified School District.

In 1984, Dr. Virginia Uribe, founded LAUSD's Project 10 program, a dropout prevention program specifically for lesbian, gay, bisexual and transgender (LGBT) students in the United States.

By the 1980s, the proliferation of magnet schools caused an exodus of many White students and several of the school's best teachers. By that time the test scores declined and many school clubs and activities ceased operations.

Organized by a group of local theater artists, the first Melrose Trading Post flea market was held in 1996 in the school's parking lot. Regarded as the most successful on-going fund-raising activity in the LAUSD, the flea market evolved into the Greenway Arts Alliance, the Friends of Fairfax and the Institute for the Arts at Fairfax High School, all which are of immense benefit to the school and students.

Demographics
As of the 2015–2016 school year, there were 2,108 students enrolled in Fairfax High School.

The racial/ethnic composition (as of the 2015–2016 school year) was as follows:

According to U.S. News & World Report, 92% of Fairfax's student body is "of color", with 79% of the student body coming from economically disadvantaged households, determined by student eligibility for California's reduced-price meal program.

In the 1950s, Fairfax High School was known for having a large Jewish student body, as a Jewish community surrounded the school. It became known as a "Jewish" high school, and some non-Jewish parents withdrew their children from Fairfax as they felt discomfort with the Jewish character of the school. In 1953, Fairfax High introduced Modern Hebrew classes, initially taught by the principal of the Beverly-Fairfax Jewish Community Center, Ronnie Tofield.

The racial composition became significantly more multi-cultural following the integration efforts of 1968. As Fairfax principal William Layne told the Los Angeles Times in 1975, “Fairfax began changing in 1968. Then the boundaries were adjusted to include an area past Pico. It caused a trauma to what had been an all-white, academic school. There was strong reaction from the community as well. The senior citizens got upset when they saw a kid they couldn't identify with. There was also unrest at school, fearfulness, and an increase in thefts and people being molested."

Eventually, racial tensions subsided as the school worked toward an active integration plan led by Layne.

The table below represents the number of enrolled students at Fairfax High School through 2003–2007.

Source:

Small Learning Communities
Fairfax High School re-opened in fall 2008 reconfigured into a complex consisting of the existing Fairfax Magnet Center for Visual Arts and five new small learning communities (SLCs). The campus was divided into six areas of "contiguous space". Non-magnet students and staff were reorganized into five new schools-within-a-school. Subsequently, in 2010, two of the SLCs were replaced by a single SLC, bringing the total down to four SLCs and the Magnet. Currently, these SLCs are:

Academy of Media & Performing Arts (AMPA)
Academy of International Business and Communications (IBC)
Health Sciences Academy (HSA)
School of Mathematics, Science and Technology (SMST).

Fairfax Magnet Center for Visual Arts
It opened in 1981 and is the only visual arts magnet in Los Angeles Unified School District.

Greenway Arts Alliance
Fairfax High School is home to the Greenway Arts Alliance, which operates the Greenway Court Theater, a 99-seat Equity-waiver playhouse, and through the Institute for the Arts at Greenway, provides arts educational programs, mentoring, and employment opportunities to Fairfax students.

Since 1997, the Melrose Trading Post outdoor flea market has created opportunities for Fairfax High School and the surrounding neighborhood. Money raised by this nonprofit organization from the low-cost patron admission and vendor booth fees fuels an arts education program on the FHS campus called, Institute for the Arts at Greenway.

Notable alumni
 Byron Allen, talk show host and businessman
 Herb Alpert (born 1935), musician, recording artist, music industry executive
 Michael "Flea" Balzary, musician, bassist, trumpet player (Red Hot Chili Peppers)
 Steve Barri, songwriter and record producer
 Saul Brandman (1925–2008), garment manufacturer
 Cary Cooper, psychologist
 J. Curtis Counts (1915–1999), Director of the Federal Mediation and Conciliation Service
 George W. Dickerson, college football coach
 Boris Dralyuk, poet, editor, translator
 Diane Ellis, actress
 James Ellroy, author of L.A. Confidential
 Mike "SuperJew" Epstein (born 1943), Major League Baseball player
 Danny Everett (born 1966), 1988 Olympic gold medalist 4x400 metres relay
 Wild Man Fischer, street performer
 Janet Fitch, author
 Manuel Franco, lawyer and judge from the television shows La Corte del Pueblo and Juez Franco
 Larry Friend (1935–1998), National Basketball Association (NBA) player 
 Rob Gardner, musician, L.A. Guns, founding drummer of Guns N' Roses
 Larry Gelbart, Emmy-winning, Oscar-nominated writer/producer, M*A*S*H
 Michele Greene, actress
 Rose Greene (1946–2019), financial planner and LGBT activist
 Thierry Guetta, street artist 
 Tracii Guns, musician, L.A. Guns, founding guitarist of Guns N' Roses, whose surname was used in helping name the band
 Jim Hardy, NFL quarterback
 Jerome Hines, opera singer
 Kathleen Hughes, actress 
 Joe Hunt, tennis player
 Timothy Hutton, Oscar-winning actor
 Chanel Iman, model
 Jack Irons, musician, drummer (Red Hot Chili Peppers, Pearl Jam, The Wallflowers)
 Mike Jagosz (1965–2014), original lead vocalist for L.A. Guns and Pyrrhus
 David Janssen (1931–1980), actor, TV series The Fugitive and films
 Alain Johannes, musician (Anthym, Eleven)
 Gary Karr, classical double bassist
 Jack Kemp (1935–2009), U.S. Representative, 1996 Republican vice-presidential candidate and pro football quarterback for the Buffalo Bills
 Anthony Kiedis, musician, singer, writer (Red Hot Chili Peppers)
 Erwin Klein (d. 1992), table tennis player
 Annette Kleinbard (later changed her name to Carol Connors), lead singer of the Teddy Bears ("To Know Him Is to Love Him"). As Connors, co-wrote "Gonna Fly Now" from Rocky, and the Ripcords' "Hey Little Cobra".
 Lenny Krayzelburg (born 1975, as Leonid Krayzelburg), backstroke swimmer, Olympic gold medalist, and former world record holder
 Mila Kunis (born 1983), actress
 Barry Latman (born 1936), Major League Baseball player
 Marshall Leib, singer
 Angelo Leo, boxer
 Jerome "Jerry" Leiber (1933–2011), lyricist of Jerry Leiber and Mike Stoller
 Cirroc Lofton, actor, Star Trek: Deep Space Nine
 Carole Lombard, Oscar-nominated actress
 Quinn Martin, producer
 Barry Miller, actor
 Roger Montgomery, basketball player and sports agent
 Demi Moore (born 1962), actress (dropped out at age 16)
 Ricardo Montalbán, actor, Fantasy Island, Star Trek II: The Wrath of Khan
 Mo Ostin (1927–2022), record executive and producer
 Baby Peggy, child actor, later author under name Diana Serra Cary; attended in the 1930s
 Burt Prelutsky (1940–2021), screenwriter, journalist and author 
 Doria Ragland, mother of Meghan, Duchess of Sussex
 Mickey Rooney, Oscar-nominated actor featured in hundreds of Hollywood films
 Aaron Rosenberg (1912–1979), All-American college football player, and film and television producer 
 Joe Ruby, co-creator of Scooby-Doo
 Ann Rutherford, actress
 Henry Samueli (born 1954), co-founder of Broadcom Corporation
 Doug Sax (1936 - 2015) Mastering engineer and co-founder of The Mastering Lab and Sheffield Lab record label.
 Allan Sherman, musician, parodist, satirist, and television producer
 Larry Sherry (1935–2006), Major League Baseball pitcher; MVP of the 1959 World Series
 Norm Sherry (1931–2021), Major League Baseball player and manager
 Al Silvera (1935–2002), Major League Baseball player
 Slash (Saul Hudson), musician, guitarist (Guns N' Roses, Velvet Revolver)
 P. F. Sloan (Philip Schlein), musician, songwriter ("Eve of Destruction", "Secret Agent Man"); graduated 1963
 Hillel Slovak, musician, guitarist (Red Hot Chili Peppers)
 Smear, contemporary artist, street artist
Craig Smith, basketball player
 Phil Spector, record producer
 Cynthia Szigeti, actress and improv teacher (The Groundlings)
 Chris Thompson, TV producer and writer
 Roger Wagner, choral musician, administrator, and educator 
 Chris Weber, musician, guitarist (Hollywood Rose)
 Marilyn Wilson-Rutherford (née Rovell), singer, The Honeys
 Zev Yaroslavsky, Los Angeles City Council member, 1975–1994 and Los Angeles County Supervisor, 1994–2014
 Tony Young, actor
 Warren Zevon, musician

References

Sources

External links
 
 Greenway Arts Alliance
 Melrose Trading Post
 The Colonial Gazette, online version of FHS's student newspaper
 Views from Fairfax High

Los Angeles Unified School District schools
High schools in Los Angeles
Educational institutions established in 1924
Public high schools in California
Fairfax, Los Angeles
1924 establishments in California